Agni Sakshi is 1996 Indian Hindi-language thriller drama film directed by Partho Ghosh, written by Ranbir Pushp and Hriday Lani, starring Jackie Shroff, Nana Patekar and Manisha Koirala. The music is by Nadeem-Shravan. Nana Patekar and Manisha Koirala were widely appreciated for their performances  with Patekar winning  the National Film Award for Best Supporting Actor in 1997.

The film released in quick succession with Yaraana, starring Madhuri Dixit and Daraar, starring Juhi Chawla. All the three were based on the Julia Roberts-starrer Sleeping with the Enemy; only Agni Sakshi proved to be successful (the other two remakes were not as successful as this movie at the box office). After a few years, this film was remade loosely in Oriya as Mu Sapanara Soudagar, starring Sabyachi, Archita and Arindam. In 1996 a Bengali film Bhoy was also made based on the same plot. Agni Sakshi was rated the first among top five "super-hit" films of 1996 by the Indian Express.

Plot
Suraj Kapoor is a single, wealthy young man. One day he meets Shivangi, and they fall in love. Shortly thereafter, they marry and settle down to enjoy a harmonious married life. During their stay at a hotel, the couple are approached by a man who claims that Shivangi is his wife and her real name is Madhu. Suraj and Shivangi are shocked and ask him to leave, which he does. Then the guy rings up Suraj one night and asks him to come to his room. When Suraj comes the guy tells him that his name is Vishwanath. He shows Suraj a video of his and Madhu's wedding. Shockingly, Madhu resembles Shivangi to the core. Even after watching the video, Suraj disbelieves him. On Shivangi's birthday, while everyone is celebrating the party, flashbacks of the time when Vishwanath used to abuse and torture his wife Madhu prove that indeed Shivangi was married to Vishwanath. After showing the flashback, Vishwanath kidnaps Shivangi and tries to see a mark on her body that will prove that she's indeed Madhu. But Suraj comes just in time and accidentally pushes Vishwanath off a cliff. Suraj then leaves the city and returns home along with Shivangi.

One day Shivangi goes shopping and meets Vishwanath. He brings her father with him, who denies the fact that Shivangi is in fact Madhu. Frustrated, Shivangi runs home and tells Suraj that Vishwanath is alive. Suraj leaves with his brother Ravi to tell the commissioner. While Shivangi is home alone, she sees Vishwanath out the window, and gets a call from him. Suraj returns and then traces Vishwanath's call. Vishwanath surrenders himself because he wants to talk to Suraj. The police let Vishwanath go. The following night, Suraj overhears Shivangi talking on the phone with Vishwanath. After she's done talking, she admits that she's in fact Madhu. Madhu was fed up with Vishwanath's constant abuses and high-handedness. One day, Vishwanath and Madhu go for a trip. But their jeep meets with an accident and falls down into a river. Vishwanath seemingly drowns and Madhu thinks he's dead. She goes to her father and tells him what happened. Madhu's father tells her that she's still young and has a life ahead of her. She should start living her life afresh with a new identity in a new place. That she does.

She moves to India and changes her name to Shivangi, so that no one can recognize her over there. After Shivangi finishes her story, Suraj tells her that he still loves her even after knowing who she really is. He hatches a plan to send Vishwanath to prison for the rest of his life. Suraj tells Shivangi to go to Vishwanath pretending to be Madhu. She does so and she tries to shoot Vishwanath, however, Vishwanath shoots Shivangi, It is revealed that the cartridges in the gun were actually fake. In the climax, Vishwanath reveals that he knew the cartridges were fake as he was being taken to the court. He overpowers the constables, grabbing one of their guns. Then he goes to Shivangi and tells her that he knew what she did. Saying so, he shoots himself.

Cast

 Jackie Shroff as Suraj Kapoor
 Nana Patekar as Vishwanath
 Manisha Koirala as Shivangi Kapoor / Madhu
 Divya Dutta as Urmi
 Ravi Behl as Ravi Kapoor
 Alok Nath as Madhu's father
 Ashalata Wabgaonkar as Suraj's Mother
 Achyut Potdar as Commissioner of Police
 Subbiraj as Suraj's father

Soundtrack
The music for the album is composed by Nadeem-Shravan. The singers who lent their voices are Kumar Sanu, Kavita Krishnamurthy, Sonu Nigam, Alka Yagnik, Vinod Rathod, Alisha Chinai, Jolly Mukherjee & Babul Supriyo,. The song "O Piya O Piya" & "O Yaara Dil Lagana" were popular song.

Reception

Box office
The film grossed rupees Rs 41 crores worldwide at that time and was declared a "Blockbuster".

References

External links 

1990s Hindi-language films
1996 films
Films about domestic violence
Films featuring a Best Supporting Actor National Film Award-winning performance
Films scored by Nadeem–Shravan
Indian thriller drama films
Films directed by Partho Ghosh
Hindi-language thriller films